"The Ways to Love a Man" is a 1969 single by Tammy Wynette, who co-wrote the song with Billy Sherrill and Glenn Sutton. It was Wynette's sixth number one on the U.S. country singles chart. The single remained at the top of the chart for fifteen weeks.

Chart performance

References
 

1969 singles
Tammy Wynette songs
Songs written by Billy Sherrill
Songs written by Glenn Sutton
Song recordings produced by Billy Sherrill
Epic Records singles
1969 songs
Songs written by Tammy Wynette